Gigaton is the eleventh studio album by American rock band Pearl Jam, released March 27, 2020. It was preceded by the singles "Dance of the Clairvoyants", "Superblood Wolfmoon" and "Quick Escape". It is the band's first studio album in six and half years. The cover artwork was produced by photographer Paul Nicklen. Its release was scheduled to coincide with a tour of North America. However, the North American leg was postponed due to the COVID-19 pandemic and eventually rescheduled to occur in 2022.

Background and recording
Producer Josh Evans told Varietys Jonathan Cohen that "Seven O'Clock" was pieced together from different portions of a jam early in the recording sessions, and then layered with new elements later on. Eddie Vedder's vocal on the solo acoustic "Comes Then Goes" was captured on the first take, while the 1850s-era pump organ Vedder played on the 2015 demo of "River Cross" was retained for the studio version.

Critical reception

 AllMusic critic Stephen Thomas Erlewine rated the album 4 out of 5 stars, noting that its three highlights were "Who Ever Said", "Dance of the Clairvoyants" and "Never Destination". Rolling Stone writer Kory Grow also gave the album a positive review, also rating it 4 out of 5 stars. Grow wrote that Gigaton is "an admirable, inspiring example of grown-up grunge". Spin writer John Paul Bullock was also positive toward the album, writing, "Gigaton has a little something for everyone. It's a complex, dynamic album full of earnest emotion and subtle humor". Mojo, in yet another positive review, wrote, "Strong and loose, political and personal, Pearl Jam get the balance absolutely right".

Kerrang! writer George Garner gave the album a perfect score, and wrote: "it's Pearl Jam's most incensed album since 2006. It's their most musically inventive since 1998. And, by virtue of its themes, it is their most gravely needed of their entire career. It is, in short, a triumph". Garner also noted that Gigaton "often zips along so quickly that on first listen it's easy to miss the details that make it so special".

Writing for The A.V. Club, Alex McLevy gave the album a B, criticizing it for being uneven, but praising the band for musical experimentation and writing that it "stands out in comparison to several more recent Pearl Jam albums due to the improved ratio of hits to misses on the back half". Consequence of Sound critic Matt Melis graded the album a B+, noting that the three best songs from Gigaton were "Superblood Wolfmoon", "Quick Escape" and "Retrograde".

Steve Lampiris of The Line of Best Fit considered Gigaton the band's most experimental album, and gave it a score of 8 out of 10. Tom Hull was less impressed, giving it a B grade and saying that it is "not bad, nor especially interesting, and by the end I was reminded of how tedious Eddie Vedder's voice is."

Accolades

Commercial performance
On the US Billboard 200, Gigaton debuted at number 5 with 63,000 equivalent album units, marking the band's twelfth top 10 album. Of that sum, it sold 14,000 vinyl copies, the second-largest weekly vinyl sales for a 2020 release.

Track listing

PersonnelPearl JamJeff Ament – bass guitar, keyboards and guitar on "Dance of the Clairvoyants" and "Quick Escape", drum loop on "Quick Escape", keyboards on "Alright" and "Seven O'Clock", Mbira on "Alright" and "River Cross", programming on "Seven O'Clock", piano on "Buckle Up", production, layout, concept (credited as Al Nostreet)
Matt Cameron – drums, drum programming on "Dance of the Clairvoyants", guitar on "Alright" and "Take the Long Way", vocals and programming on "Take the Long Way", production
Stone Gossard – guitar, bass on "Dance of the Clairvoyants", percussion on "Buckle Up", vocals on "Buckle Up", keyboards on "Retrograde", production
Mike McCready – guitar, percussion on "Dance of the Clairvoyants", keyboards on "Retrograde", production
Eddie Vedder – vocals, guitar, keyboards on "Seven O'Clock", pump organ on "River Cross", production, concept and layout (credited as Jerome Turner), textAdditional personnel'
Ames Bros. – text
John Burton – engineering
Josh Evans – keyboards on "Superblood Wolfmoon", "Never Destination", "Buckle Up" and "River Cross", drum programming on "Alright", production
Meagan Grandall – backing vocals on "Take the Long Way"
Bob Ludwig – mastering
Paul Nicklen – photography
Brendan O'Brien – keyboards on "Quick Escape" and "Retrograde"
Joe Spix – layout

Charts

Weekly charts

Year-end charts

References

External links

2020 albums
Pearl Jam albums
Albums produced by Brendan O'Brien (record producer)
Republic Records albums
Monkeywrench Records albums
Post-punk albums by American artists
Experimental rock albums by American artists